Jantje is a given name. Notable people with the name include:

Jantje Friese (born 1977), German film producer and screenwriter
Jantje Hagenou-Bathoorn (born 1934), Dutch speed skater
Jantje Visscher, American painter, printmaker, photographer, sculptor, teacher, and mentor

See also
Jantjes